The 2007 Abia State House of Assembly election was held on April 14, 2007, to elect members of the Abia State House of Assembly in Nigeria. All the 24 seats were up for election in the Abia State House of Assembly.

Results

Osisioma South 
PDP candidate Ahamefula Onyeike won the election.

Umuahia North 
PDP candidate Emeka Ejiogu won the election.

Umuahia Central 
PPA candidate Grace Nkem Uche won the election.

Isiala Ngwa North 
PPA candidate Fidelis Nwachukwu won the election.

Isiala Ngwa South 
PDP candidate Darlington Nwoke won the election.

Isuikwuato 
PPA candidate Monday Ejiegbu won the election.

Umuahia East 
PPA candidate Nwoke Chidiebere won the election.

Umunneochi 
PPA candidate Matthew Ibe won the election.

Ukwa West 
PPA candidate Chinedum Elechi won the election.

Ukwa East 
PPA candidate Asifore Okere won the election.

Obingwa East 
PDP candidate Solomon Akpulonu won the election.

Obingwa West 
PPA candidate Uche Nwankpa won the election.

Umuahia South 
PPA candidate Chijioke Madumere won the election.

Ikwuano 
PPA candidate Wisdom Ogbonna won the election.

Ugwunagbo 
PDP candidate Humphery Azubuike won the election.

Ohafia North 
PPA candidate Ude Oko Chukwu won the election.

Aba Central 
PPA candidate Uzor Azubuike won the election.

Osisioma North 
PDP candidate Ikechukwu Nwabeke won the election.

Aba North 
PPA candidate Blessing Azuru won the election.

Arochukwu 
PPA candidate Agwu Ukakwu Agwu won the election.

Aba South 
PPA candidate Nwogu Okoro won the election.

Bende North 
PPA candidate Oji Lekwauwa won the election.

Bende South 
PPA candidate Chima Onyegbu won the election.

Ohafia South 
PDP candidate Mba Ukaha won the election.

References 

Abia State House of Assembly elections
2007 Nigerian House of Assembly elections